Luciano De Ambrosis (born 28 March 1937) is an Italian actor and voice actor.

Biography
De Ambrosis was born in Turin, the youngest of four siblings. His father worked for the Italian automobile manufacturer Fiat. He made his film debut at only five years old, playing the lead role in Vittorio De Sica's acclaimed film The Children Are Watching Us. He went on to play the protagonist in many other films through the next six years.

He acted infrequently on-camera afterwards but maintains a successful career as voice actor. He is the regular dubbing voice for Burt Reynolds, James Caan and Dennis Farina. He also dubs Albert Finney, Jon Voight, Seymour Cassel, John Mahoney, Nick Nolte, Frank Langella, Brian Cox and since 1994, he voiced Sean Connery in most of his films after the death of Pino Locchi. His son Massimo De Ambrosis is also a voice actor.

He lives and works in Rome.

Filmography

Cinema
The Children Are Watching Us (1943) 
L'angelo del miracolo (1945)
Casello N. 3 (1945)
La vita semplice (1946)
Senza famiglia (1946)
Ritorno al nido (1946) 
Heart and Soul (1948) 
Tomorrow Is Too Late (1950)
VIP my Brother Superman (1968) - voice
The Case Is Closed, Forget It (1971) - voice, uncredited
L'Aretino nei suoi ragionamenti sulle cortigiane, le maritate e... i cornuti contenti (1972) 
Torso (1973) 
They Were Called Three Musketeers But They Were Four (1973) - voice, uncredited

Dubbing roles

Animation
The King in Arthur and the Invisibles
The King in Arthur and the Revenge of Maltazard
The Toad in Flushed Away
Rama in The Jungle Book
King Dymas in Sinbad: Legend of the Seven Seas
Cera’s father in The Land Before Time
Fred's father in Big Hero 6
Bigwig in Watership Down
Mr. Pricklepants in Toy Story 4

Live action
Jonathan E. in Rollerball
Mike Locken in The Killer Elite
Tommy Korman in Honeymoon in Vegas
Frank Colton in Bulletproof
Paul Sheldon in Misery
Walter Hobbs in Elf
Frank Athearn in Comes a Horseman
Robert DeGuerin in Eraser
Spud Spaldoni in Dick Tracy
Freebie in Freebie and the Bean
Eddie Dohun in A Bridge Too Far
Bankie Como in Men of Respect
Clell Hazard in Gardens of Stone
President of the United States in Get Smart
Bo Darville in Smokey and the Bandit
Coach Nate Scarborough in The Longest Yard
Ernie Mullins in Breaking In
Walker in Lucky Lady
David Fowler in The Man Who Loved Women
Walter Burns in Mystery, Alaska
Jack Horner in Boogie Nights
John L. Sullivan IV in Switching Channels
Joey Pistella in The Crew
King Konreid in In the Name of the King
Martin Crane in Frasier (seasons 1-5)
Perry White in Superman
Perry White in Superman II
Perry White in Superman III
King Arthur in First Knight
Robert "Mac" MacDougal in Entrapment
Paul in Playing by Heart
William Forrester in Finding Forrester
King Richard in Robin Hood: Prince of Thieves

References

External links

 
 

1937 births
Living people
Actors from Turin
Italian male film actors
Italian male voice actors
Italian male television actors
Italian male child actors
Italian voice directors
20th-century Italian male actors
21st-century Italian male actors